Storsand is a village in Melhus municipality in Trøndelag county, Norway. The European route E06 highway and the Dovrebanen railway line both run through the village. Melhus Church is located in the village.

References

Villages in Trøndelag
Melhus